The 2015 Africa U-23 Cup of Nations qualification was a men's under-23 football competition which decided the participating teams of the 2015 Africa U-23 Cup of Nations. Players born on or after 1 January 1993 were eligible to compete in the tournament.

A total of eight teams qualified to play in the final tournament, including Senegal who qualified automatically as hosts.

The top three teams of the final tournament will qualify for the 2016 Summer Olympics men's football tournament in Brazil.

Teams
A total of 26 CAF member national teams entered the qualifying rounds.

Notes
The final tournament was originally to be hosted by the Democratic Republic of the Congo. After Senegal replaced them as hosts, the CAF released an updated version of the draw. In the initial draw, Zimbabwe and Swaziland were to play each other in the first round, where the winner would play South Africa in the second round, where the winner would play Senegal in the third round. In the updated draw, Zimbabwe and Swaziland play each other in the second round, where the winner play South Africa in the third round.
Namibia's U23 team manager Jakes Amaning said the Namibia Football Association did apply to take part in the tournament, but due to unforeseen circumstances its name did not appear in the CAF draw. The Confederation of African Football have said the Namibian application may not have been received due to a "technical error". Although the draw took place on 20 September 2014, FIFA have set a deadline of 25 October for applicants.

Format
Qualification ties were played on a home-and-away two-legged basis. If the aggregate score was tied after the second leg, the away goals rule would be applied, and if still level, the penalty shoot-out would be used to determine the winner (no extra time would be played).

The seven winners of the third round qualified for the final tournament.

Schedule
The schedule of the qualifying rounds was as follows.

First round

|}

Note: Guinea-Bissau and Libya withdrew. Liberia played their home match in Ghana due to Ebola outbreak. Somalia played their home match in Djibouti (originally in Kenya) due to security concerns.

Ghana won 7–1 on aggregate.

Sierra Leone won on walkover.

Mauritania won on walkover.

4–4 on aggregate. Botswana won on away goals.

Rwanda won 3–1 on aggregate.

Second round

|}

Note: Sierra Leone played their home match in Cameroon due to Ebola outbreak.

1–1 on aggregate. Congo won on penalties.

1–1 on aggregate. Sierra Leone won on away goals.

Mali won 4–2 on aggregate.

Zambia won 3–1 on aggregate.

Uganda won 4–1 on aggregate.

2–2 on aggregate. Zimbabwe won on away goals.

Tunisia won 3–0 on aggregate.

Third round
Winners qualified for 2015 Africa U-23 Cup of Nations.

|}

Note: Sierra Leone played their home match in Algeria due to Ebola outbreak (match also brought forward by a week).

Nigeria won 2–1 on aggregate.

Algeria won 2–0 on aggregate.

Mali won 3–0 on aggregate.

0–0 on aggregate. Zambia won on penalties.

Egypt won 6–1 on aggregate.

South Africa won 4–1 on aggregate.

Tunisia won 2–1 on aggregate.

Qualified teams
The following eight teams qualified for the final tournament.

1 Bold indicates champion for that year. Italic indicates host for that year.

Goalscorers
4 goals

 Kahraba
 Adama Niane

3 goals

 Omaatla Kebatho
 Dauda Mohammed
 Michael Olunga
 Keagan Dolly
 Farouk Miya

2 goals

 Abdelhakim Amokrane
 Junior Ajayi

1 goal

 Onkabetse Makgantai
 Unobatsha Mbaiwa
 Joseph Minala
 Silvère Ganvoula
 Moise Nkounkou
 Mohamed Salem
 Ramadan Sobhi
 Kennedy Ashia
 Ebo Andoh
 Richard Gadze
 Baba Mensah
 Tamimu Montari
 John Ndirangu
 Van-Dave Harmon
 Moctar Cissé
 Adama Traoré
 Boubacar Bagili
 Mamadou Niass
 Achraf Bencharki
 Isaïe Songa
 Yannick Mukunzi
 Kevin Muhire
 Dominique Savio Nshuti
 Ibrahim Sorie Barrie
 Abbas Mohammed
 Gift Motupa
 Muzi Dlamini
 Mxolisi Mkhontfo
 Ghailene Chaalali
 Haythem Jouini
 Slimane Kchok
 Yassine Meriah
 Edem Rjaïbi
 Muzamir Mutyaba
 John Ssemazi
 Jackson Chirwa
 Kelvin Kampamba
 Ronald Kampamba
 Tino Kadewere
 Walter Musona
 Ronald Pfumbidzai

Own goal
 Karl Mboudou (playing against Mali)

References

External links
Africa U-23 Cup Of Nations,Senegal 2015 Qualifiers, CAFonline.com

Qualification
U-23 Cup of Nations qualification